This article contains information about the literary events and publications of 1752.

Events

January 4 – The Paper War of 1752–1753 begins with the first issue of The Covent-Garden Journal, where Henry Fielding starts a long quarrel with John Hill by declaring war against hack writers. Tobias Smollett soon becomes involved, accusing Fielding of plagiarism.
February 29 – Thomas Sheridan introduces at the Smock Alley Theatre in Dublin a version of Shakespeare's Coriolanus that incorporates parts of the version by James Thomson, as Coriolanus, or The Roman Matron.
September 15 – At Williamsburg, Virginia, Lewis Hallam begins a North American tour with his brother William's company, with a production of Shakespeare's The Merchant of Venice.
unknown date – The first of the Herculaneum papyri are discovered.

New books

Fiction
Charlotte Lennox – The Female Quixote
Voltaire – Histoire du docteur Akakia et du natif de Saint-Malo

Drama
Samuel Foote – Taste

Poetry

Moses Browne – The Works and Rest of the Creation
John Byrom – Enthusiasm
Richard Owen Cambridge – A Dialogue Between a Member of Parliament and His Servant
Thomas Cooke – Pythagoras
William Mason – Elfrida
Christopher Smart – Poems

Non-fiction
George Ballard – Memoirs of Several Ladies of Great Britain Who Have Been Celebrated for their Writing or Skill in the Learned Languages, Arts, and Sciences
George Berkeley – A Miscellany
Thomas Birch – The Life of John Tillotson
Francis Blackburne – A Serious Inquiry into the Use and Importance of External Religion
William Dodd – The Beauties of Shakespeare
Henry Fielding as "Sir Alexander Drawcansir" – The Covent-Garden Journal (periodical)
John Hawkesworth – The Adventurer (periodical)
David Hume – Political Discourses
William Law
The Spirit of Love
The Way to Divine Knowledge
Henry St. John – Letters on the Study and Use of History
José Francisco de Isla – Cartas de Juan de la Encina
Diego de Torres Villarroel – Obra`

Births
January 3 – Johannes von Müller, Swiss historian (died 1809)
February 17 – Friedrich Maximilian Klinger, German dramatist and novelist (died 1831)
June 13 – Fanny Burney, English novelist and diarist (died 1840)
November 20 – Thomas Chatterton, English poet and forger of medieval poetry (died 1770)

Deaths
September 19 – Louis Fuzelier, French dramatist (born 1672)
September 22 – Péter Apor, Hungarian historian writing in Latin (born 1676)
October 24 – Christian Falster, Danish poet and philologist (born 1690)
November 2 – Johann Albrecht Bengel, German New Testament commentator (born 1687)
November 5 – Carl Andreas Duker, German classical scholar (born 1670)
Unknown date – Li E (厲鶚), Chinese poet (born 1692)

See also
Augustan literature

References

 
Years of the 18th century in literature